"Angela" is a 2009 single by Jarvis Cocker.  It is the first single from his second solo album "Further Complications".

Cocker told Q magazine that the song was about "thwarted lust." He elaborated to NME about the song: "Angela is the girlfriend of our keyboard player, Simon Stafford, but I didn't realize that at the time. I was singing these words and I noticed that he was looking at me in a strange way. He said, "Why have you written a song about my girlfriend?" I'd forgotten that she was called Angela, so I think he thought I was trying to maybe move in on her. I assured him it was a co-incidence."

The single was released digitally on 17 April 2009. The song impacted US radio on May 12. It was released as a limited edition vinyl single on 15 June with a song called "I Found Myself Looking for God" as the B-side.

Track listing
"Angela"
"I Found Myself Looking for God"

References

2009 singles
Jarvis Cocker songs
Song recordings produced by Steve Albini
Songs written by Jarvis Cocker
2009 songs
Rough Trade Records singles